This list of protected areas of Quebec includes federally, provincially and municipally administered parks and wildlife reserves in Quebec, the largest province in Canada.

National Parks 

Note that both federally  and provincially administered parks in Quebec are labelled "parc national" (national park). Federal national parks are distinguished by the addition of "of Canada" in their official name.

Parks Canada
The following parks are managed by Parks Canada:
Forillon National Park of Canada
La Mauricie National Park of Canada
Mingan Archipelago National Park Reserve of Canada
Saguenay–St. Lawrence Marine Park, a National Marine Conservation Area (jointly with Sépaq)

Sépaq
In Quebec, provincial parks are called "national parks", and are managed by the Société des établissements de plein air du Québec, also known as Sépaq.

Aquatic, Biodiversity, and Ecological Reserves of Quebec
The ecological reserves, the biodiversity reserves  and the aquatic reserves are managed by the Ministère du Développement durable, de l’Environnement et des Parcs (Ministry of Sustainable Development, Environment and Parks) of Québec.

Zone d'exploitation contrôlée
In Quebec, the 86 "zone d'exploitation contrôlée" (controlled harvesting zone) (ZEC) are managed by non profit corporation. This category of protected areas is subdivided by "Zec of rivers" (mainly for fishing mission) and "Zec of lands".

Regional Parks

 Parc régional Boréal (Manicouagan);

 Parc régional des Trois-Sœurs (La Tuque);

 Parc régional du Marécage-des-Scots (Le Haut-Saint-François);

 Parc régional Obalski (Chibougamau).

Parc régional de la Rivière Gentilly

 Parc régional des Appalaches (Montmagny)

 Parc régional des Grandes-Coulées (L'Érable)

 Des Grèves Regional Park

 Parc régional du Massif-du-Sud (Bellechasse, Les Etchemins)

 Parc régional du Mont-Ham (Les Sources)

 Parc régional du Mont-Saint-Joseph

 Parc régional du Poisson-Blanc (Antoine-Labelle)

 Parc régional éducatif du Bois de Belle-Rivière

 Parc régional du réservoir Kiamika (Antoine-Labelle);

 Parc régional de la Montagne-du-Diable (Antoine-Labelle)

 Parc régional Val-David -Val-Morin

 Vallée Bras du Nord

 Base de plein air Ste-Foy

 Centre de la Côte Boisée & Les Sentiers de l'Estrie

TERFA secteur Le Canyon des Portes de l'Enfer

Parc Aventures Cap Jaseux

Parc de la Riviere Batiscan

Parc de Gros Cap

Parc de la gorge Coaticook – Parc Découverte nature

Parc de la Rivière-des-Mille-Iles

Parc d’escalade et de randonnée de la Montagne d’Argent

Parc linéaire le P'tit train du Nord

 Parc naturel régional de Portneuf (Portneuf)

Parc régional de Beauharnois-Salaberry

Parc régional de la Rivière-du-Nord

Parc régional de la Forêt Drummond 

Parc régional de la rivière Mitis

 Parc régional de la Seigneurie-du-lac-Matapédia (La Matapédia)

Parc Régional des Chutes Monte-à-Peine-et-des-Dalles

Parc régional des Grandes-Rivières du Lac Saint-Jean

Parc régional du Lac 31 Milles

Parc régional Saint-Bernard

Lanaudière
Parc régional de la Forêt Ouareau (Matawinie)

 Parc régional des Sept-Chutes (Matawinie)
 Parc régional du Lac-Taureau (Matawinie)
 Parc régional de la Chute-à-Bull (Matawinie);

Other parks

 Gatineau Park is federal park located near the city of Gatineau, just north of Ottawa, Ontario. It is not part of the national park system of Canada and is administered by the federal National Capital Commission.
 Canal de l'Aqueduc
 Cap-Saint-Jacques Nature Park
 Champ de Mars
 Dorchester Square
 Île de la Visitation
 Île Notre-Dame
 Jacques Cartier Park
 James-Darby Park
 Jarry Park
 Lac Beauchamp Park
 Maisonneuve Park
 Montreal Archipelago Ecological Park
 Morgan Arboretum
 Mount Royal Park
 Oxford Park
 Parc Aquarium du Québec
 Parc du Mont-Comi
 Parc écologique des Sansonnets
 Parc Jean-Drapeau
 Parc Lafontaine
 Place Émilie-Gamelin
 Plains of Abraham
 Saint Helen's Island

See also
 Canyon Sainte-Anne
 Cap Tourmente National Wildlife Area
List of National Parks of Canada
List of Canadian provincial parks
Zone d'exploitation contrôlée (Controlled harvesting zone) (ZEC) in Quebec

References

External links
Sépaq official site (Parcs Quebec)
Parks Canada official site

Quebec
Protected areas